Lezhë District was one of the 36 districts of Albania, which were dissolved in July 2000 and replaced by 12 newly created counties. It is in the north-west of the country, and its capital was the city of Lezhë.

Lezhë District is located in north Albania and is a region with thousands of years of history. In Lezhë the League of Lezhë was created under the order of Gjergj Kastrioti Skanderbeg.

Many famous people are from Lezhë, such as Frang Bardhi and Gjergj Fishta. The waves of the Adriatic Sea which hit the shore of Lezhë start at the Shëngjin Harbor, one of the three largest harbors of Albania, and up to Tale. The rivers Mat and Drin flow through the district and pour into the Adriatic Sea.

Administrative divisions
The district consisted of the following municipalities (population in 2007 in parentheses):

Balldren i Ri (9,872)
Blinisht (5,177)
Dajç (7,053)
Kallmet (6,607)
Kolsh (6,259)
Lezhë (24,994)
Shëngjin (10,340)
Shënkoll (13,523)
Ungrej (3,154)
Zejmen (8,752)

Note: - urban municipalities in bold

References

External links 
 Lezha.eu Lezha Online News
 Lezha.info Lezha Travel & Tourism
 Shengjini.com Shengjin Travel & Tourism

Districts of Albania
Geography of Lezhë County